Philip Ainsworth Means (1892–1944) was an American born anthropologist and historian. He was most well known for his study of South America, specifically Peru. Means made a total of 5 extended trips to Peru where he studied the Incas of the Cuzco area, published multiple books, supervised excavations, and held the position of Director of the National Museum of Archeology in Lima, Peru. His book, Ancient Civilization of the Andes (1931), was one of the first to explain Incan history and culture. His works include History of the Spanish Conquest of Yucatan and of the Itzas (1917), Fall of the Inca Empire and the Spanish Rule in Peru, 1530–1780 (1932), The Spanish Main: Focus of Envy, 1492–1700 (1935) as well as a publication regarding the Newport Tower in Rhode Island (1942).

Early life 

Philip Ainsworth Means was born in 1892 in Boston, to parents James and Helen Goodell. He graduated from Harvard in 1915 and received a Master of Arts degree from that institution the following year. His studies were directed toward Hispanic America, specifically Peru, and combined archeology, history, and literature. His formal university studies were supplemented by wide travel and study in museums and archives. In 1934 he married Miss Louise Munroe who accompanied him on his later travels and assisted him in his scholastic publications.

Peruvian expeditions 

Means' first trip to Peru was from 1914 to 1915 as a member of Yale Peruvian Expedition under the direction of Dr. Hiram Bingham. This first trip sparked his interest in the Inca Empire of the Cuzco region. He returned from 1917 to 1918 where he visited many sites from Bolivia in the south to Piura on the far north coast of Peru. From 1918 to 1919 he supervised expeditions in Piura and served as Director of the National Museum of Archeology in Lima from 1920 to 1921. He then traveled throughout all of Latin America for 11 years before returning to Peru for his final time in 1932; it was during this time that Means served as an associate in anthropology at the Peabody Museum at Harvard several times, and also wrote one of his most renowned books Ancient Civilizations of the Andes, a historical account of the Andes during the reign of the Inca people.

Archaeological technique 

Means took a historical approach to his studies by combining documentary and archaeological findings. His interest tended to focus on the chronological advancement of artwork and textiles of a given culture. For example, the Mochica or Early Chimu was considered slightly earlier than Nazca because its art was more fresh and youthful. He categorized textiles by technique and cultural period. Means was convinced that this precolumbian style of artwork belonged in the category of world art and was adamant in calling it to the attention of art exhibits and magazines. He also contributed to the field of history by translating many of the basic documentary writings of early chroniclers including those of Pedro Sancho, Fernando Montesinos, Pedro Pizarro, and Francisco de Elorza y Rada.

Publications 

Ancient Civilizations of the Andes(1931) was originally intended as part of a trilogy, however Means died before the third book was complete. This publication gave a unique account of the history of the Andes within the Inca empire. The second book of the intended trilogy was entitled Fall of the Inca Empire and Spanish Rule in Peru( 1932) which focused on the territories of the modern republics of Ecuador, Peru, and Bolivia, and portions of Colombia, Argentina, and Chile. It covers the time period from 1530 to 1780 AD Much of the writing for these two books was done while Means was back in the United States and able to conduct research in the libraries of Harvard and Yale. Another popular publication of Means' was The Spanish Main (1935). This book focused on the Spanish colonial rule during the 1700s in Northern South America and focused on the geographic locations from Panama to Trinidad and the waters along the coast. Means published a number of other books and articles including:
A History, of the Spanish Conquest of Yucatan and of the Itzas (1917)
A Survey of Ancient Peruvian Art (1917) 
Racial Factors in Democracy (1918)
La Civilización precolombina de los Andes (1919)
 Aspectos, cronológicos de las civilizaciones andinas (1921)
 Editor Relación of Pedro Sancho (Cortes Soc.) (1918)
 Relación of Pedro Pizarro (Cortes, Soc.) (1921)
Memorias Antiguas of F. Montesinos (Hakluyt Soc.) (1921) 
A Study of Ancient Andean Social Institutions (1925) 
Biblioteca Andina, Part I (1928)
 A Study of Peruvian Textiles (1932)
The Incas: Empire Builders of the Andes (1938)
Tupak of the Incas (a book for children) (1942)
Newport Tower (1942) 
as well as articles on pre-Columbian Andean art in magazines and museum bulletins in this country and in Peru, 1940–41.

The Newport Tower 

Philip Ainsworth Means also published Newport Tower (1942) regarding the Newport Tower in Newport, Rhode Island. The Tower is a circular stone structure that was thought by many to be a sign of ancient vikings in the new world.  The stone shell of a building is twenty-four feet tall and originally known as the Old Stone Mill of Governor Benedict Arnold. Arguments ensued between scholars as to whether the tower was evidence of Norse Vikings, or simply an abandoned tower from colonial times. The arguments for Viking construction were based primarily on architectural details, and Means took upon himself the task of tackling the issue from a scholarly angle. He attempted to be unbiased, however his pro-Norse favor was clearly present. 
                                                                       
Although his publication is well researched, it argues against the theory of Colonial origins for the tower. Means tentatively dates the Tower's construction to about A.D. 1120 but was prepared to add on a hundred years or so. He makes a special plea for scientific excavations. Despite a few offers of private funding for a Newport tower dig, the Park Commission of Newport flatly refused for fear the tower would be damaged. Means proposed that the Excavators Club at Harvard would be perfect for the job and predicted that if a dig did happen there would be a 50% chance nothing would be found, 35% chance there would be Norse material, 10% chance that seventeenth century construction would be confirmed and 5% chance it would date to A.D. 1492-1580.

Eventually, after World War II, the Newport Tower was taken up as an archaeological problem by the Peabody Museum at Harvard and a committee was formed for excavation. Harvard graduate student William S. Godfrey, Jr., a direct lineal descendant of Governor Arnold was the excavator. His conclusions were that the tower dated to the seventeenth century and had no Norse history. The artifacts found consisted of clay pipe fragments, gun flints, datable pottery, glass and nails. He suggested that the building had been built around 1650, making it one of the oldest standing buildings in North America.  Means remained skeptical of the date of the tower.

See also 
Newport Tower (Rhode Island)

References

External links

 
 
 

1892 births
1944 deaths
20th-century American historians
American male non-fiction writers
Writers from Boston
Historians of Peru
Harvard University alumni
Historians from Massachusetts
20th-century American anthropologists
20th-century American male writers
American expatriates in Peru